Özbey is a Turkish surname. Notable people with the surname include:

Merve Özbey
 Erkan Özbey (born 1978), Turkish footballer
 Rızvan Özbey
 Tolgay Özbey (born 1986), Australian footballer

Turkish-language surnames